Samuel Gurney may refer to:

 Samuel Gurney (1723–1770), whose daughter married Samuel Hoare Jr
 Samuel Gurney (1786–1856), head of Gurney's Bank and Overend, Gurney and Company
 Samuel Gurney (MP) (1816–1882), his son, MP for Penryn & Falmouth

See also
Gurney family (Norwich)